Saint-Malo Cathedral (Cathédrale Saint-Vincent-de-Saragosse de Saint-Malo) is a Roman Catholic Cathedral located in Saint-Malo, Brittany, France. The church was founded in dedication to Saint Vincent of Saragossa and is a national monument of France. It was built in a mix of Roman and Gothic styles during the episcopacy of Jean de Châtillon (1146-1163) on the site of an ancient church founded in the 7th century. The cathedral suffered damage during World War II when the steeple toppled onto the Sacred Heart Chapel. An organ which had been built in 1893 by Louis Debierre was destroyed. On 21 May 1972, after 28 years of work, a ceremony was held to celebrate the completion of the restoration. It is a stop on the Tro Breizh, a Catholic pilgrimage that links the towns of the seven founding saints of Brittany.

History

Early history 
Historical records of the rocky outcrop on which Saint-Malo stands show that a hermit called Aaron d'Aleth founded a hermitage there towards the middle of the 6th century. A Welsh monk called Maclow or Mac Law or Malo arrived to the rock and joined Aaron. Malo devoted himself to preaching and in due course became Bishop of Aleth (Saint-Servan). He was succeeded by Saint Gurval who had a church built in honour of his predecessor. This church, burnt by Charlemagne's lieutenants in 811, was rebuilt in 816 by bishop Hélocar and was given the name of the deacon saint Vincent d'Espagne who had been martyred in 304 by Diocletian. In the middle of the 9th century, the Breton king Nominoë nominated Aleth as the location of the episcopacy and called it "Pagus Alethensis".

The Norman invasions of the 10th century left the church in ruins. In 1108, it was gifted to the Benedictine Abbey of Saint-Martin de Marmoutier in Touraine who converted the church into a priory. Jean de Châtillon, the Saint-Malo bishop, retook the church after a long struggle and rebuilt it completely around 1152, making it a cathedral and calling it Saint-Malo. He also transferred the episcopacy from Aleth to Saint-Malo-de-l'Isle (on the "rocher of Aaron"). This action created an episcopal area which included the ancient parish of Saint-Servan. In this period, the ecclesiastical authority dominated the town but by the beginning of the 13th century, the Dukes of Brittany started to plot to retake Saint-Malo Cathedral. In the following centuries, Saint-Malo was to be embroiled in many international and dynastic struggles.

Later history 
Several elements of de Châtillon's 12th-century building remain today including part of the cloisters, the nave, and the transept crossing. The choir was constructed in the 13th century. The construction of the tower started in the 12th century and was finished in 1422. The south side of the cathedral and the three chapels in the choir area date to the 15th century. Between 1583 and 1607, the north side of the cathedral was reconstructed and the north transept enlarged. In the 18th century the south chapel was built and the façade of the cathedral was reconstructed between 1772 and 1773. A door, previously kept in the courtyard of the Hôtel-Dieu in the rue Saint-Sauveur, was brought to the cathedral in the early 17th century and a portal from the Chapelle Sainte-Anne-des-Ursulines was placed in the south-west of the cathedral.

The cathedral was the ancient bishopric of Saint Malo from the year 1146 until 1801 when the Concordat of 1801 abolished that bishopric and divided its territory between the Rennes, Saint-Brieuc, and Vannes bishoprics. In 1146, Jean de Châtillon, who had been the bishop of Aleth since 1144, transferred his bishopric to Saint-Malo which was considered more secure a base than Aleth. In 1146, Pope Eugène III agreed to the transfer. The monastery of Saint Malo, founded in 1108, became de Châtillon's official residence and the monastery became a cathedral replacing the previous cathedral of Saint-Pierre at Aleth. Thus, the cathédrale de Saint-Malo was born. Jean de Châtillon was also known as "Jean de la Grille" as when he was buried in the cathedral his tomb needed a grill installed to ward off his many fervent admirers.

Interior
The layout of the cathedral follows that of the Latin cross. The vaulting of the choir and the south aisle is ogival (gothic). The vaulting for the north aisle is groin vaulting and the ceiling of the south chapel is decked with modern paneling. Overlooking the ambulatory is a stone 12th-century sarcophagus containing the relics of Jean de Châtillon, the first bishop of Saint-Malo. At the base of the chevet is a chest containing the relics of a 2nd-century martyr Saint Célestin, given by the pope Pius VII to Saint-Malo's last bishop Monseigneur Courtois de Pressigny. This gisant in the cathedral dates to the 15th century. The statues of "La Foi", Saint Maur, and Saint Benoit in the cathedral are the work of Francesco Maria Schiaffino from Genoa. They date to 1743 and came from an old Benedictine church which subsequently became the Saint-Malo "Palais de Justice". 

In the south nave is a wooden pulpit that dates to the 18th century and survived the 1944 bombing. On the west face of the arm of the north transept, there is a fountain known as the "Fontaine Saint-Jean" or "Saint-Côme" which was restored in 1719. The Saint-Côme wing on the north façade was designed and built by the architect Thomas Poussin between 1593 and 1607. The wing on the south side is known as the "Saint Julien wing" and was built between 1461 and 1486. This wing has an entrance door known as the "Porte de Velours" which was added in 1851. The stalls and the pulpit date to the 18th century and one gisant in the cathedral dates to the 13th century. There is an old baptismal font of 12th-century origin and a 19th-century baldaquin. The wooden statue titled "Notre-Dame de la Croix du Fief" dates to the 17th century. The reliquary containing Jacques Cartier's skull is in a neighbouring chapel.

The main altar 

The bronze high altar in the cathedral was consecrated on 8 December 1991 and was the work of the painter Arcabas and Étienne Pirot. The theme of the altar is the tetramorph or the four Evangelists appearing in animal form. The four Evangelists are winged; the wing is an ancient symbol of divinity with each representing the virtues required for Christian salvation. The lion of St Mark represents courage, resurrection, and royalty. The ox is an ancient Christian symbol of redemption and life through sacrifice and signifies Luke’s records of Christ as a priest and his ultimate sacrifice for the future of humanity. The eagle of John represents the sky, heavens, and the human spirit. Matthew's emblem is a man. These four symbols first appear in the Book of Ezekiel as the four animals pulling the chariot of Ezekiel's vision (Ezekiel 1. 1-14) and later in St John's Apocalypse (Apoc 4; 7-8), later being adopted by the Church as the emblems of the four Evangelists. The high altar furnishings include desks, an armchair and two stools, an elaborately carved stoup, and a candlestick.

Organ 
The pipe organ was built in 1977 by Koenig and inaugurated in 1980. It is composed of four keyboards, one pedal, and 35 stops. This organ replaced an older one built in 1893 by the Nantes born Louis Debierre in the romantic style, which was destroyed in 1944. A new choir organ of two keyboards, one pedal, and 18 stops built by Koenig was added in 2014.

Stained glass windows in the nave 
The stained glass windows are the work of Max Ingrand. They depict scenes chronicling the history of the city and the cathedral.
On the south side of the nave are two windows. One depicts the arrival of the Welsh monk Malo in about 560 at Aaron's hermitage. A small chapel marks the spot where the hermitage stood "La Chapelle Saint-Aaron". The second window shows Jacques Cartier being blessed by the bishop as he leaves on a voyage in 1535 that would lead to the discovery of Canada. On the north side of the nave are three windows. One celebrates the martyrdom in 304 of Vincent of Saragossa, the patron of the cathedral. Another celebrates the foundation of the See of Saint-Malo by Jean de Châtillon in 1152. The third depicts the Tro-Breiz pilgrimage to the relics of the seven founders of the Breton bishoprics. Above the main door, hidden by the organ, stained glass depicts the Assumption of the Virgin. ("l'Assomption de ls Sainte Vierge").

The Great Rose window and other stained glass 
The Great Rose window was the 1968 work of the architect Raymond Cornon and replaced the great rose window destroyed in 1693 during an attack on the cathedral by the English. On the north side of the building, there is a 1970 stained glass window by Jean Gouremelin and Michel Durand which depicts Paul Aurélien, Tugdual, Corentin, Malo, Guillaume, Samson and Patern. Other windows in the choir, the chevet, the ambulatory and the transept were the work of Jean Le Moal and Bernard Allain.

Transept 
The arms of the transept date to 1623 and contain four windows.

La Vierge de la Grand’Porte/Notre-Dame de la Grand'Porte 

This 15th-century marble statue is greatly venerated by the people of Saint-Malo and is also known as the "Miraculeuse Protectrice de la Cité Malouine", as it was associated over the years with various legends and miracles. For hundreds of years, the statue had in fact been placed in a niche over one of the entrances through the city's defensive wall. In 2003, he statue was restored and placed inside the cathedral by the entrance to the sacristy to protect it from the elements. A copy was made and is still kept in the defensive wall niche

Capitals in the nave and transept 
Several of the capitals of the pillars supporting the roof of the nave and transept crossing have carvings that are both grotesque and biblical. These capitals, not easily visible from the ground due to their height, date to the 12th century.

Stations of the Cross 
There is a "Chemin de Croix" (Stations of the cross) in the cathedral by Henri Chaumont.

Burials

Jacques Cartier 
The cathedral holds the tomb of the French explorer Jacques Cartier who was born in St Malo on 31 December 1491 and died there on 1 September 1557.  The tomb is in a chapel off of the ambulatory and north of the choir. In 1949, the original grave was during the course of excavations and moved to its present location.

René Duguay-Trouin 
Privateer and St. Malo native René Duquay-Trouin was initially buried in the Saint-Roch church in Paris but his remains were moved to Saint-Malo on the three hundred year anniversary of his birth.

Tower
In 1422, rebuilding of the tower was started using the foundations of the earlier tower. In August 1858, Napoleon III and Empress Eugénie were passing through Saint-Malo and were persuaded by Abbé Jean-François Huchet to finance the addition of an arrow to the tower spire which would be visible from the sea. There is a statue of Abbé Jean-François Huchet in the cathedral by Jean-Marie Valentin that statue stands on the south side of the ambulatory.

The tower was completely destroyed during the 1944 bombing but replaced in 1972. The new tower's design was based on a Norman church in Périers. The tower has four bells:

 "Jean de Châtillon" which chimes the note "re". The bell weighs 1.500 kg and was blessed on 16 September 1894,
 "Jacques Cartier" which chimes the note "do". The bell weighs 2.550 kg and was blessed on16 September 1894,
 "Noguette" which chimes the note "si". The bell weighs 1750 kg. It was recast and blessed on 12 November 1989,
 "Gros Malo" which chimes the note "si-flat". The bell weighs 3.500 kg. It was recast and blessed on 17 July 1994

The 1944 bombing

The city of Saint Malo suffered much bombing and artillery fire by both Germans and Americans during fighting in early August 1944.  Shells fired from a German minesweeper on 6 August decapitated the cathedral steeple which toppled onto the Sacred Heart Chapel causing huge damage. One of the casualties was an old organ which had been built in 1893 by Louis Debierre. On 21 May 1972, after twenty-eight years of work, a ceremony was held to celebrate the completion of the cathedral's restoration which had been masterminded by Raymond Cornon and Pierre Prunet, the then official architects for historic monuments. Cornon also worked on reconstructions in Fougères, Rennes, Quimper, Vannes, Nantes and Vitré.

Old Cathedral of Saint-Pierre at Aleth

All that is left of the original cathedral at Aleth are ruins as seen in the photograph shown here. When in 1144 the bishopric was transferred to Saint Malo, Aleth put itself under the protection of Saint-Servan.

See also
Église Saint-Patern de Vannes
Quimper Cathedral
Dol Cathedral
Saint-Brieuc Cathedral
Tréguier Cathedral
Saint-Pol-de-Léon's Cathedral of Saint Paul Aurélien 
the Notre-Dame du Kreisker Chapel and Chapelle Saint-Pierre and cemetery

Sources

 Organs in France: brief history of cathedral 
 Catholic Hierarchy: Diocese of Saint-Malo

Roman Catholic cathedrals in France
Churches in Ille-et-Vilaine
Saint-Malo
Tro Breizh
Monuments historiques of Ille-et-Vilaine